Arthroschista is a genus of moths of the family Crambidae.

Species
Arthroschista hilaris Walker, 1859
Arthroschista tricoloralis (Pagenstecher, 1888)

References

Spilomelinae
Crambidae genera
Taxa named by George Hampson